Heike Tischler (born 4 February 1964 in Saalfeld, Thuringia) is a retired German heptathlete.

She won the silver medal for East Germany at the 1990 European Championships in Athletics in Split with a personal best score of 6572 points. This ranks her eighth among German heptathletes, behind Sabine Braun, Sabine Paetz, Ramona Neubert, Anke Behmer-Vater, Heike Drechsler, Ines Schulz and Sibylle Thiele. At that point, East Germany was already scheduled for reunification with West Germany as modern Germany and so this was this the last championship with separate East and West German teams. She entered the 1991 World Championships (competing for reunified Germany), but did not finish the competition.

Her daughter Sophie Weißenberg also competes in the heptathlon.

European Championships in Athletics 

1990 European Championships in Athletics in Split
  Silver medal in  heptathlon

References 
 

1964 births
Living people
People from Saalfeld
East German heptathletes
European Athletics Championships medalists
Sportspeople from Thuringia
Friendship Games medalists in athletics
People from Bezirk Gera